Five Go Down To The Sea is the twelfth novel in The Famous Five series by Enid Blyton. It was first published in 1953.

Plot
Siblings Julian, Dick and Anne Kirrin, and their cousin Georgina 'George' Kirrin and her dog, Timmy, spend a holiday at a coastal farm in Cornwall. There, they are nicely welcomed and hosted by the garrulous Mrs Penruthlan and her enormous husband, whose monosyllabic utterances they find incomprehensible and quite funny. The children encounter a young boy named Yan (Jan), as well as a group of travelling entertainers called the Barnies. The children learn that long ago, villainous locals would shine a light on stormy nights to direct ships onto rocks to wreck them, and the vessels would be smashed and their cargoes washed ashore and stolen. Julian and Dick discover a light is again being shone at night, so the children set out to solve the mystery. They discover the Secret Way, a way used by the old Wreckers, and when they were locked up in a cellar and told that they had come at an 'awkward time', Yan comes and helps the Five escape, as he knew the Secret Way. They go back to Mrs. Penruthlan via the Secret Way, in the misbelief that Mr. Penruthlan is in the wrong. When the Five and Yan discover that Mr. Penruthlan is actually with the police and find out that his consistent "aahs","ooohs" and "ocks" are because he didn't have his false teeth in, the Five quickly warm up to him. Later in the book after a Barnie shows and a good meal at Penruthlans', they discover that the 'Guv'nor' of the Barnies actually is the exchanger of the goods the Wreckers stole from the wrecked ships. Mr. Penruthlan discovers a white package inside Clopper (a dangerously funny pretend horse that is the highlight of any Barnie show), and in the end, after calling the police, Mr. Penruthlan guffaws and hands Clopper over to Julian and Dick, and wishes them luck with it.

Characters
Main Characters
George Kirrin
Anne Kirrin
Dick Kirrin
Julian Kirrin
Timmy (dog)
Other Characters
Mrs Penruthlan – farmer's wife and host
Mr Penruthlan – surly farmer
Yan – a hungry and neglected orphan, who is cared for by his great granddad. He takes a liking to the five, and Anne in particular.
The Barnies and the Guv'nor (antagonist)

Adaptations
The gamebook The Wreckers’ Tower Game (1983) was based on this novel.

Other Appearances
The book is mentioned in the Podcast The Magnus Archives in statement 147 Weaver.

External links
 
Enid Blyton Society page
http://www.enidblyton.net/famous-five/five-go-down-to-the-sea.html

1953 British novels
Hodder & Stoughton books
Novels set in Cornwall
Famous Five novels
1953 children's books